Where I'm Coming From is the fourth and last album by jazz organist Leon Spencer recorded for the Prestige label in 1973 (with one track recorded in 1972).

Reception
Doug Payne stated the album was "Another good one from Leon Spencer and, regrettably, his recorded swan song as a solo artist".

Track listing
All compositions by Leon Spencer except where noted.
 "Superstition" (Stevie Wonder) – 6:45
 "Give Me Your Love" (Curtis Mayfield) – 5:23
 "Keeper of the Castle" (Brian Potter, Dennis Lambert) – 5:20
 "Trouble Man" (Marvin Gaye) – 6:45
 "The Price a Po' Man's Got to Pay" – 5:25
 "Where I'm Coming From" – 5:35
Recorded at Van Gelder Studio in Englewood Cliffs, New Jersey on February 22, 1972 (track 6) and January 26, 1973 (tracks 1–5)

Personnel
Leon Spencer – organ, vocals
Jon Faddis (tracks 1–4), Victor Paz (tracks 1–4), Virgil Jones (track 6) – trumpet
Hubert Laws – flute (tracks 6)
Seldon Powell – flute, tenor saxophone (tracks 1–4)
Frank Wess – flute, baritone saxophone, conductor (tracks 1–4)
Sonny Fortune – alto saxophone (track 6)
Dave Hubbard – tenor saxophone (track 6)
Joe Beck (tracks 1–5), Melvin Sparks (track 6) – guitar
Ernie Hayes – electric piano (tracks 1–4)
George Duvivier – bass (tracks 1–4)
Grady Tate (tracks 1–5), Idris Muhammad (track 6) – drums
Buddy Caldwell – congas (track 6)
Ed Bogas – arranger (tracks 1–4)
 Ozzie Cadena – producer
 Rudy Van Gelder – engineer

References

1973 albums
Albums produced by Ozzie Cadena
Albums recorded at Van Gelder Studio
Jazz-funk albums
Leon Spencer albums
Prestige Records albums